Molione uniacantha is a species of comb-footed spider in the family Theridiidae. It is found in Malaysia and Sumatra.

References

Theridiidae
Spiders described in 1995